Luis Exposito (born January 20, 1987) is an American former professional baseball catcher. He played in Major League Baseball (MLB) for the Baltimore Orioles in 2012.

Career

Boston Red Sox
Exposito was drafted by the Red Sox in the 31st round of the 2005 Major League Baseball Draft.

Exposito spent his  season playing for the Portland Sea Dogs leading the team with 94 RBI.

On June 8, 2011, Exposito was called up to the Red Sox as insurance after starting catcher Jarrod Saltalamacchia became ill; he filled the roster spot of Bobby Jenks, who was placed on the disabled list. Exposito was optioned to Pawtucket two days later without appearing in a game.

Baltimore Orioles
On April 17, 2012, Exposito was claimed off waivers by the Baltimore Orioles. To make room for Exposito on the 40-man roster, the Orioles designated infielder Josh Bell for assignment.

Exposito was designated for assignment on April 30, 2013.

Detroit Tigers
Exposito signed a minor league contract with the Detroit Tigers on January 9, 2014, and was assigned to AAA Toledo Mud Hens, playing for them in 29 games.

Oakland Athletics
On June 11, 2014 he was released by the Detroit Tigers and signed a minor league deal with Oakland Athletics on June 25, 2014, playing in 19 games for the AAA Sacramento River Cats. On August 3, 2014 he was released by the Oakland Athletics.

Bridgeport Bluefish
Exposito signed with the Bridgeport Bluefish of the Atlantic League of Professional Baseball for the 2016 season, but instead announced his retirement on April 8, 2016.

References

External links

1987 births
Living people
People from Hialeah, Florida
Baseball players from Florida
Baltimore Orioles players
Lowell Spinners players
Greenville Drive players
Lancaster JetHawks players
Portland Sea Dogs players
Salem Red Sox players
Norfolk Tides players
Pawtucket Red Sox players
Gulf Coast Orioles players